Kamikiri can refer to:

 Kamikiri (haircutting)
 Kamikiri (papercutting)